Frederick Horsman Varley Art Gallery, or the Varley Art Gallery of Markham, is an art museum in Markham, Ontario, Canada. The museum is situated in a  building on Main Street Unionville. The gallery was named after Frederick Varley, an artist from the Group of Seven, and was opened in May 1997.

The gallery features a frequent changing of displays of the artwork done by local, national, and international artists. The gallery offers group tours, school programs, studio courses and workshops, courses and lectures, and family activities.

The art gallery is a short walk from Salem-Eckhardt House, the historical figure Kathleen Gormley McKay's residence. The house was built in the 1840s, and later became home to Frederick Varley. Kathleen Gormley McKay donated many of the original Frederick Varley pieces to the gallery.

References

External links

 

Buildings and structures in Markham, Ontario
Art museums and galleries in Ontario
Postmodern architecture in Canada
Museums in the Regional Municipality of York
Art galleries established in 1977
1997 establishments in Ontario
Tourist attractions in Markham, Ontario